Ilya Igorevich Sorokin (born 4 August 1995) is a Russian professional ice hockey goaltender for the New York Islanders of the National Hockey League (NHL). Sorokin was selected by the Islanders in the third round (78th overall) of the 2014 NHL Entry Draft.

Playing career

KHL (2012–2020)
Sorokin played as a youth with local club, Vympel Mezhdurechensk, before joining KHL club Metallurg Novokuznetsk as a 17-year old in 2012. He made his professional and KHL debut with Novokuznetsk during the following 2012–13 season, appearing in relief during a 8–6 defeat to Barys Astana on 7 January 2013. Following two promising seasons, Sorokin was selected by the New York Islanders, 78th overall, in the 2014 NHL Entry Draft.

During his third year within Metallurg Novokuznetsk in the 2014–15 season, Sorokin appeared in 22 games before he was traded to perennial powerhouse club, HC CSKA Moscow, in exchange for financial compensation on 24 December 2014.

Sorokin continued his KHL career with CSKA Moscow by signing a three-year contract extension on 10 June 2017. In 2019, Sorokin won the Gagarin Cup with CSKA Moscow, also earning the honor of Gagarin Cup Playoffs MVP.

New York Islanders (2020–present)
On 13 July 2020, Sorokin was signed to a one-year, entry-level contract with draft club the New York Islanders for the remainder of the 2019–20 season. However, unsigned prospects from other leagues, such as Sorokin in the KHL, were ruled ineligible to feature in the Return to Play phase following the outbreak of the COVID-19 pandemic. The contract completed Sorokin's entry-level status to become a restricted free agent, and Sorokin was signed by the Islanders to a one-year, $2 million contract extension for the 2020–21 season the day after his entry-level contract was essentially nullified.

Sorokin made his NHL and Islanders debut on 16 January 2021, against the New York Rangers. Sorokin was originally slated to be the backup for the game when the intended starter, Semyon Varlamov, was injured during warmups. The Islanders lost the game 5–0, while Sorokin allowed five goals on 31 shots. Sorokin's first NHL win, and first NHL shutout, came on 16 February, in the Islanders' 3–0 win over the Buffalo Sabres. He made 20 saves in the win. Sorokin made his NHL Playoff debut against the Pittsburgh Penguins in Game 1, winning 4–3 in overtime. while Varlamov recovered from injury. Varlamov took the starting role back in Games 2 & 3 but struggled while playing through his injuries, losing both games. Sorokin took back the starting job in Game 4 and won Games 4–6, helping the Islanders win the series. Sorokin lost Game 1 against the Boston Bruins in the second round, and Varlamov became the starting goaltender for the remainder of the playoffs.

On 1 September 2021, Sorokin was re-signed to a three-year, $12 million contract by the Islanders.

Sorokin’s first NHL point came on March 9th, 2023 when he received an assist after poke checking a puck which led to a breakaway for Brock Nelson and the game winning goal in overtime against the Penguins

International play

Sorokin was a member of the Olympic Athletes from Russia team at the 2018 Winter Olympics that won the gold medal.

Career statistics

Regular season and playoffs

International

Awards and honors

References

External links
 

1995 births
Living people
HC CSKA Moscow players
Ice hockey players at the 2018 Winter Olympics
Kuznetskie Medvedi players
Metallurg Novokuznetsk players
Medalists at the 2018 Winter Olympics
New York Islanders draft picks
New York Islanders players
Olympic gold medalists for Olympic Athletes from Russia
Olympic ice hockey players of Russia
Olympic medalists in ice hockey
People from Mezhdurechensk, Kemerovo Oblast
Russian ice hockey goaltenders
Zvezda Chekhov players
Sportspeople from Kemerovo Oblast